The 2023 season is Johor Darul Ta'zim Football Club's 50th season in club history and 9th season in the Malaysia Super League after rebranding their name from Johor FC.

Background

Squad

Johor Darul Ta'zim F.C.

Johor Darul Ta'zim II F.C.

Transfers and contracts

In

Pre-season

Loan In / Return

Pre-season

Out

Pre-season

Loan Out

Pre-season

Retained

Friendly matches

Tour of UAE

Overall record

Competitions (JDT)

Overview

Malaysia Super League

Update: 16 August 2022

Table

Malaysia FA Cup

Malaysia Cup

AFC Champions League

Group stage

Competitions (JDT II)

Malaysia Football League

Club statistics
Correct as of match played on 15 May 2022

Appearances (JDT)
@ 18 Mar 2023

Appearances (JDT II)
@ 15 Mar 2023

Goalscorers
Includes all competitive matches. The list is sorted by shirt number when total goals are equal.

Top Assists

Johor Darul Ta'zim II

Malaysia Premier League

Table

Malaysia Premier League fixtures and results

References

Johor Darul Ta'zim F.C.
2023 in Malaysian football
Johor